The Stimson Safari Six is a Mini-based six-wheeled pickup motor vehicle designed by Barry Stimson. It was introduced into the UK market in 1972, when it was offered for sale by Design Developments at £800. That price included a hood covering the entire vehicle from the rear to the windscreen, with a zip-up sidescreen that served as the driver's door. The car was also available in kit form from £270, depending on its level of completion.

The Safari Six was in production for about a year before Design Developments went into receivership in 1974, having by then produced about 20 cars.

Construction
The vehicle's glassfibre body is mounted on a steel tubular-frame chassis. It has a fold-down rear bench seat and a lockable underfloor boot.

Engine and transmission
The front-wheel drive Safari Six is powered by an 848 cc (51.7 cu in) Austin Mini engine and gearbox mounted on a Mini sub frame.

Later developments
The rights to the Safari Six were acquired by Automotive Services, who planned to convert the vehicle to use a Ford Fiesta or Peugeot engine and relaunch it as the Shikara, but that never materialised.

References

Notes

Citations

Bibliography

External links
BBC archive video of a prototype Safari Six being featured on Tomorrow's World in 1971
YouTube video of the Safari Six in action

Cars introduced in 1972
Pickup trucks